Binangonan, officially the Municipality of Binangonan is a 1st class municipality in the province of Rizal, Philippines. According to the 2020 census, it has a population of 313,631 people.

A thriving fish port and fishing industry is found in Binangonan, having a long coast line facing Laguna de Bay, including the western part of Talim Island.  The plant of Rizal Cement and Grandspan are in Binangonan as well. Their main livelihood are fishing and farming.

With the continuous expansion of Metro Manila, the municipality is now part of Manila's conurbation which reaches Cardona in its easternmost part.

Etymology
It is claimed that the binañgonan means “the first town established along the lake”, in reference to a legend that tells of how the towns around Laguna de Baý were named. More likely however is that binañgonan refers to a place from where someone or something rose, based on the definition of binangunan in Tagalog. The name of the town in the colonial era (as of 18th c.) was "Binangonan de los Ferros" (Binangonan of the Dogs), that etymology might have something to do with dog breeding or hunting.

History 
The Neolithic stone engravings of the Angono Petroglyphs archaeological site represent the earliest evidence of human settlement in the region. The site contains earthenware fragments and remains of animals such as turtles and Elephas sp. The area was inhabited by both Tagalog and Aeta peoples before the arrival of the Spanish.

Spanish period 
Binangonan was initially a visita of the pueblo (town) of Moron, until it was separated and became an independent parish in 1621 through the initiatives of Franciscan missionaries. The town was established in 1737 and conquered by the Spaniards in 1763. Originally, it was organized under the province of La Laguna, until it was transferred to the newly established Distrito de Morong on 23 February 1853. The Santa Ursula Parish Church dates from this time, built from 1792 to 1800.

American period 
Binangonan became a town in 1900 during the American colonial period. On June 11, 1901, it was incorporated into the newly established Province of Rizal, after being part of the District of Morong. In the same year, Don Jose Ynares y Granados was appointed Presidente or municipal executive. He won the first municipal election held in 1902. With help from the Americans, Ynares made remarkable improvements in the town.

On October 12, 1903, by virtue of Act No. 942, it was annexed to the town Morong alongside Baras and Cardona. However, the act was amended by virtue of Act No. 984 on November 6, 1903, wherein Binangonan regained its independent status by separating from Morong and gaining Angono from Taytay.

Japanese occupation
During World War II, Binangonan was one of the evacuation centers for the residents of Manila and neighboring suburbs. People hid in the mountains and in Talim Island.  The war brought untold difficulties and sufferings. Schools were temporarily closed; professionals turned to fishing, buy and sell for living. Many died of starvation, malnutrition and diseases while others survived by eating camote tops, papaya, corn, coconut and vegetables.

Months after the Japanese occupied the town, Faustino Antiporda organized Bantay Sunog, a brigade tasked in maintaining peace and order by providing volunteer males as nightly guards against looters and trouble makers.

In April 1942, Marcos Villa Agustin founded Marking's Guerrillas, and recruited heavily in Binangonan area.  During the summer of 1942, the Rizal Cement Factory employees took action against the Japanese in the area.  Led by Trinidad Diaz, the factory cashier and Home Guard lieutenant, they killed five Japanese, including a naval architect, and turned their launch over to Marking's Guerrillas.  The Japanese took revenge, killing known resisters in the area, and torturing Diaz for 32 days, but she did not divulge the guerrilla's locations.

Major Teofilo Cenido was appointed mayor of the provost marshal of military police.  Weapons available then were one Springfield Rifle and five Granadora from five USAFFE soldiers who escaped from Bataan.

Talim Island was also subjected to Japanese sona.  On August 7, 1942, bombs were dropped in the neighboring towns killing four in Janosa and claiming a number of casualties in Cardona.  Suspected guerillas were brought to Santa Cruz, Laguna.  Even the parish priest at that time, a Columbian Fr. Martin Strong, was held in Los Baños concentration camp.

Late in 1944, the Makapilis identified mostly as Kapampangan's, a group of pro-Japanese Filipinos, occupied the convent and served as Japanese interpreters.  They were instruments in the cruelties suffered by the Filipinos.

In January 1945, the Japanese took the convent from the Makapilis and put up their headquarters.  But they only stayed there for one week, scared of the nightly apparitions of a white lady believed to be the ghost haunting the convent.

Mayor Emerenciano Unida was killed by the Japanese when he refused to reveal the guerrilla organization.

Period of independence
Binangonan was liberated from the Japanese forces on February 25, 1945, the feast day of the patroness of the town, Santa Ursula. The Japanese' plan to burn the town was prevented by the timely arrival of American forces on the eve of the feast day. The local guerillas, with Major Ceñido deploying his men in Bunot Mountain, prevented the escape of Japanese forces. The Japanese peacefully retreated and pulled their forces out.

The liberation was quite peaceful for no fighting ever took place.  It was also a glorious celebration as barrio folks rode on top of tanks and jeepneys with the soldiers of the combined Filipinos and Americans. People lined along the streets, jumping with glee, weeping tears of joy while shouting "Victory".
The American and Filipino military commander instructed the guerillas led by Major Ceñido to set up temporary headquarters in poblacion and to do surveillance work.  When the combined Filipino and American troops proceeded to Angono, they left the command under the local Military Police, composed of all units in Binangonan.

Napoleon Antazo, the town commander of the Hunters ROTC guerillas, was appointed mayor through the orders of the 43rd Infantry Division of the U.S. Army.  Next to be appointed town mayor from 1945 to 1946 was Casimiro Ynares Sr., son of Don Jose Ynares.  When the Philippines became a Republic in 1946, the municipal government was allowed greater autonomy.

Post-war accomplishments 1946-1951 
The first mayor after World War II was Dr. Jose Pacis.  Among his accomplishments were as follows.

 Construction of wharf linking the Muella de Santa Ursula to Pritil.
 Construction of a modern public market, a self-liquidating project funded by the Rehabilitation Finance Corporation.
 Construction of combined basketball courts and tennis courts in the town's plaza.
 Beautification of the Kalbaryo.
 Additional artesian wells.
 Construction of a new street extending from Munting Bundok to M. H. del Pilar Street, the only one in eastern Rizal at that time, which was completed with the P25,000.00 funds donated by ex-Senator Vicente Madrigal to Mayor Jose Pacis.

Conversion to cityhood

As early as January 18, 2016, the town's Sangguniang Bayan approved Resolution No. 78, Series of 2016 requesting the Senate of the Philippines thru its president Franklin Drilon and the House of Representatives thru its speaker Feliciano Belmonte Jr. to co-sponsor a bill for Binangonan's conversion into a city and creation of a lone legislative district.

Geography 

Binangonan is bounded to the north-northwest by Angono, the north-northeast by Teresa and Morong, and to the east by Cardona. It is divided between two regions, the mainland and the insular areas. The mainland is on the western side of the Morong Peninsula, and is characterized by small steep hills surrounded by lowlands. It is cut off by an escarpment to the east, which forms the boundary with Cardona. Short streams predominantly drain westward into Laguna de Bay.

Talim Island contains a narrow coastal plain that readily ascends into its mountainous interior, with Mount Tagapo (438 m) as its highest peak. It is separated from the mainland by the 240-m Diablo pass.

Climate
Binangonan features two climate types under the Köppen-Geiger climate classification: tropical monsoon with a short dry season and a prolonged wet season, and tropical savanna with more pronounced wet and dry season. The dry season runs from January through April while the wet season covers the remaining eight months of the year. Binangonan is consistently hot throughout the year, usually reaching its highest temperatures just before the onset of the monsoon. The town's coolest temperatures are typically experienced at night during the earliest portions of the dry season.

Barangays

Binangonan is politically subdivided into 40 barangays, of which 23 are on the mainland and 17 are island barangays.

Demographics

Economy

Binangonan's major source of income comes from agriculture, where 49 percent of its total land area are devoted to agriculture and livestock industries, while the source of income of residents in its coastal barangays are mainly artisanal fishing and the aquaculture industry. Binangonan is a major supplier of freshwater fishes from Laguna de Bay like dulong, ayungin, biya, kanduli, and gurami to Metro Manila, Laguna, Cavite and Batangas. A research station of the Southeast Asian Fisheries Development Center is located at Tapao Point in Barangay Pipindan.

The municipality formerly hosted the Rizal Cement plant in Calumpang and its associated quarry. This plant was the oldest in the Philippines, established in 1914 by Augustinians and eventually acquired by Vicente Madrigal. A limestone quarry in Pantok supplied the plant through a cable car system. The plant was shut down in 2000 and subsequently transformed into a subdivision.

Other sources of income come from manufacturing, commercial establishments, real estate, and public utility services.

Binangonan's economy remained docile for almost four decades, subsisting only with fair performance in the aquaculture and agricultural ventures with no new developments in-place to create job opportunities in the commercial sector. Tourism industry's growth remains to be seen in the long-term. Industries relative interests to the town has to be developed and the corresponding infrastructure must be funded and implemented accordingly to create and sustain future development.
Overall expectations to encourage investment must be prioritized rather than enticing the growth of informal settlers (squatters) in the area which was perceived by many to be more of strategic political undertakings.

Tourism 

Tourist Attractions
 East Ridge Golf and Country Club
 Thunderbird Resorts and Fiesta Casino
 Talim Island
 Mount Tagapo Nature Park
 Vicente Manansala Shrine
 Santa Ursula Parish Church
 Mount Calvary (Kalbaryo)
 Marian Hill
 Tabon
 Binangonan Recreation and Conference Center
 Puente Del Diablo
 Angono-Binangonan Petroglyphs
The Lighthouse at Santorini Estates

Festival and Traditions
 Caru-Caruhan de Binangonan
 Annual Traditional Ball
 Brgy. Libid Grand Santacruzan
 Binalayan Festival
 Sunduan
 Giwang-Giwang

Government 

Current Officials

List of former mayors

American period

Japanese period

Post-war to present

List of former vice mayors

Post-war to present

Healthcare
 Binangonan Municipal Community Health Center, Libis
 Binangonan Lakeview Hospital, Tagpos
 Pag-asa Hospital, Pag-asa
 Margarito A. Duavit Memorial Hospital - Rizal Provincial Hospital System, Binangonan (Annex)
 St. Bernard Infirmary and Multi-Specialty Clinic, Pantok

Barangay Health Centers are present in all 40 barangays

Education
The Department of Education operates 36 elementary and 9 secondary schools in the municipality. A campus of the University of Rizal System is present. A Technical Education Skills Development Authority (TESDA) center established in the municipality provides technical and vocational courses. Over 50 private schools are also found within the municipality,

Public 

Tertiary
University of Rizal System - Binangonan Campus

Secondary
Rizal National Science High School
Vicente Madrigal National High School
Guronasyon Foundation Inc. National High School
Don Jose M. Ynares Sr. Memorial National High School
Margarito A. Duavit Memorial National High School
Mahabang Parang National High School
Janosa National High School
Talim National High School
Pag-asa National High School

Elementary

DISTRICT I
Binangonan Elementary School
Calumpang Elementary School
Darangan Elementary School
Mahabang Parang Elementary School
Libis Elementary School
Libid Elementary School
Macamot Elementary School
Tatala Elementary School
Casimiro Ynares Elementary School
Pila-Pila Elementary School

DISTRICT II
Lunsad Elementary School
Limbon-Limbon Elementary School
Ithan Elementary School
Kalinawan Elementary School
Pipindan Elementary School
Kasile Elementary School
Bombong Elementary School
Kinagatan Elementary School
Kinaboogan Elementary School
Bangad Elementary School
Buhangin Elementary School
Janosa Elementary School
Kaytome/Gulod Elementary School
Sapang Elementary School
Malakaban Elementary School
Pinagdilawan Elementary School
Tabon Elementary School
Talim Elementary School
Banaba(Rayap) Elementary School

DISTRICT III
Tayuman Elementary School 
Tagpos Elementary School
Pag-asa Elementary School
Doña Susana Memorial Elementary School
Bilibiran Elementary School
Mabuhay Homes 2000 Elementary School
Don Jose Ynares Sr. Elementary School
Sitio Mata Elementary School

Private 

Tertiary
Binangonan Catholic College
PBTS Academy

Secondary
Binangonan Catholic College
Southwell School
Genesis De Rizal School
Tres Niños School Inc
Bilibiran Christian School
Child Jesus Prague School
Child's Place Developmentally Appropriate Program School

Elementary
Binangonan Catholic College (Sta. Ursula Parish School)
Right Step School of Learning
Child's Place D.A.P School Inc.
Bilibiran Christian School Inc.
Palm Mary Private School.
Little Children of Isaac
SMA Lerning School(Pantok)
SMA Lerning School(San Carlos)
Binangonan Catholic College
Child Jesus of Prague School Inc. 
Tres Ninos Learning Center Macee Academy
Gain Knowledge Learning Center
Shining Light Christian Academy
Binangonan Garden of Learners
Sanlex Divine Grace Academy
PBTS Academy(Macamot)
PBTS Academy(Pantok)
PBTS Academy(Bilibiran)
PBTS Academy(Tagpos)
Niña Maria Learning Center
Southwell School
Raises Montessori Academy(Calumpang)
Raises Montessori Academy(Pantok)
Raises Montessori Academy(Pag-asa)
Claremont School.
Zion Hills Christian Academy Inc.   
Knights & Archers Montessori
Children's Brighter Educ.Learning
Throne of Wisdom Christian Academy
Remi Andrea School
Sunnyvale Christian School
Early Bird Learning Academy Inc.
Maries Christian School
Optimus Center for Development(Bilibiran)
Optimus Center for Development(Tayuman)
Angono Spring Academy School Inc.
Bridge of Light Grace Christian Academy Inc.
Growth for Knowledge Learning Center Inc.

Cultural properties 

|}

 Gloc-9, rap artist, musician, songwriter

References

External links

 
 Binangonan Profile at PhilAtlas.com
 Taga-Binangonan Ako!
 Binangonan Rizal
 [ Philippine Standard Geographic Code]
 Philippine Census Information
 Local Governance Performance Management System

 
Municipalities of Rizal
Populated places on Laguna de Bay